Atthaphol Permsiri (born January 1984) is a Thai footballer. He plays for Thailand Premier League clubside Samut Songkhram FC.

See also
Football in Thailand

References

1984 births
Living people
Atthaphol Permsiri
Association football defenders
Atthaphol Permsiri
Atthaphol Permsiri